Aemene marginipuncta is a moth of the family Erebidae. It was described by George Talbot in 1926. It is found on Borneo and Peninsular Malaysia.

References

Cisthenina
Moths described in 1926
Moths of Asia